Pseudosophronia is a genus of moth in the family Gelechiidae.

Species
 Pseudosophronia constanti (Nel, 1998)
 Pseudosophronia cosmella (Constant, 1885)
 Pseudosophronia exustellus (Zeller, 1847)

References

Anacampsini